Kępica  is a village in the administrative district of Gmina Świerzno, within Kamień County, West Pomeranian Voivodeship, in north-western Poland.

Before 1637 the area was part of Duchy of Pomerania. For the history of the region, see History of Pomerania.

References

Villages in Kamień County